Business Bay (: Al-Khaleej Al-Tijari) is a central business district under construction in Dubai, United Arab Emirates. The project features numerous skyscrapers located in an area where Dubai Creek has been dredged and extended, and located immediately south of Downtown Dubai. Business Bay will have upwards of 240 buildings, comprising commercial and residential developments. The infrastructure of Business Bay has been completed in 2008, and the entire development was expected to be completed between 2012-2015.
Business Bay is part of the vision of His Highness Sheikh Mohammed Bin Rashed Al Maktoum, UAE Vice President, Prime Minister, Minister of Defence, and Ruler of Dubai. Business Bay will be a new 'city' within the city of Dubai and is being built as a commercial, residential and business cluster along a new extension of Dubai Creek extending from Ras Al Khor to Sheikh Zayed Road. It will become the region's business capital as well as a freehold city.

Development

The projected population of the entire development is more than 191,000, and the estimated population of employers and others is 110,000, making the total population more than 300,000. Commercial development will comprise , which is 18.5 percent of the entire development; mixed use development will comprise  (59.4 percent); and residential development will cover  (22.1 percent). Business Bay will cost AED 110 billion (US$30 billion).

Bay Square

Bay Square is a mixed-use community within Business Bay. The entire development will be a pedestrian-only zone, and will include walkways over canals. When completed it will comprise canals, sidewalks, restaurants, cafes and retail stores. It will have  of office space; Bay Square will host numerous small and medium-sized enterprises. Bay Square was expected to be completed in 2010. It will comprise the following buildings:

Bay Square Commercial Building
Bay Square Hotel
Bay Square Office Building (10 Office Buildings in total)
Bay Square Residential Building

The Executive Towers

The Executive Towers at Business Bay consist of 12 towers, which includes residential, commercial and office towers. These are the first buildings to be completed in Business Bay and are located near its entrance. A three-storey podium connects all the towers in addition to the nearby Vision Tower, which is going to be connected by a special passage.

Escape Tower 
Escape Tower is adjacent to the Business Bay Metro Station Land Side. It consists of residential apartments with a total of 40 floors above the ground. The building is accompanied with a gym and a swimming pool. A designated parking building is close the Tower and is inter connected with each other by a walking bridge.

Bay Avenue

Bay Avenue is an arena of two levels of indoor and outdoor retail space. It will have cafes, restaurants, boutiques, showrooms, plazas, children's play areas and sporting facilities. However, nearly two years after completion, the first couple of shops are only nearing completion.

Dubai Creek Extension

Dubai Creek Extension is a part of the Business Bay development. Dubai Creek will be extended from its original place to Business Bay to the Persian Gulf through Safa Park and Jumeirah. The project will be carried out in three phases. Completion was scheduled for 2007, but is now expected by the end of 2010. Some 10 kilometres of the total 12.2 kilometres of the Dubai Creek extension work has already been completed in Business Bay.

Transportation

Business bay is connected to Red Line of Dubai Metro with Burj Khalifa and Dubai Mall station and Business Bay Station, which opened on 25 April 2010, together with most of the remaining stations of Dubai Metro's Red Line.

Planned Buildings
There will be over 230 towers in the Business Bay district. This list has 32 projects, covering 44 individual towers.

List of Completed Buildings

* indicates building is still under construction, but has been topped out

Other low-rise buildings

Sobha Sapphire
Iris Bay
The Prism
One Business Bay
Falcon Tower
The Forum
The Regal Tower
The Court
Park Lane Tower
Sky Tower 1
The Oberoi Business Bay
Bayswater
O14
Crystal Tower
Ontario Tower
The Exchange
The Conclave
The Binary
Business Tower
West Bay Tower
XL Tower
Opus Building
The Peninsula
B2B Tower

Images

See also
Al Habtoor City
DAMAC Towers by Paramount Hotels & Resorts
Dubai Properties

References

External links
Official Website

Financial districts in the United Arab Emirates
Communities in Dubai
Bays of the United Arab Emirates
Central business districts in the United Arab Emirates
Mixed-use developments in the United Arab Emirates